Eleutherodactylus apostates is a species of frog in the family Eleutherodactylidae endemic to the Massif de la Hotte, southwestern Haiti. It is sometimes referred to as the apostates robber frog The specific name is an allusion to its closest relatives being from northern Hispaniola, its southern distribution being an apostasy of sorts.

Description
Eleutherodactylus apostates males are much smaller than females, only  in snout–vent length compared  in females. Dorsal colouration and patterns are variable, particularly in females, but generally speaking Eleutherodactylus apostates is a pinkish tan to grayish brown frog.

Habitat and conservation
Eleutherodactylus apostates live in closed-canopy forest at elevations of  asl. Males call near streams. The type locality was a wooded ravine bordering a small creek.

The range of this species is suffering from severe habitat destruction, primarily due to logging for charcoal production by local people and by slash-and-burn agriculture. Part of its range overlaps with the Pic Macaya National Park, but the park is not managed for conservation. It was formerly common in suitable habitat but has not been seen after 2005.

References

apostates
Endemic fauna of Haiti
Frogs of Haiti
Amphibians described in 1973
Taxonomy articles created by Polbot